Helvetestinden (lit. Hell Peak) is a granite mountain peak located near Bunes beach, municipality of Moskenes, in Lofoten, Norway. It is known for the 602 m high climbing route on the west facing vertical cliff.

Most hikers summit it through the south side ridge which requires scrambling along a narrow ridge at the top. Once at the peak, hikers can view the Norwegian sea to the west, the isolated white sandy beach of Bunestranda below, and Kierkefjorden to the south.

References

External links
 http://peakbook.org/en/peakbook-element/859/en/Helvetestinden.html
 http://www.geographic-coordinates.com/coordinates/latitudelongitude/NO/helvetestind/29397

Mountains of Nordland
Moskenes